The Local is a Toronto-based general interest online magazine covering urban health and social issues. It was founded in 2019 as a not-for-profit organization, with Tai Huynh, Nicholas Hune-Brown, Jen Recknagel and Craig Madho as its founding editorial team. The Local publishes mostly long-form features, investigations and essays on a quarterly basis. From 2017 to 2019, The Local was a hyper-local storytelling project incubated at UHN OpenLab, a design and innovation studio at the University Health Network.

The Local is known for blending human-interest stories with data journalism, most notably during the COVID-19 pandemic when it published five issues dedicated to exploring the pandemic’s impact on Toronto communities.

In 2021, The Local began tracking and reporting COVID-19 outbreaks in schools. They maintained a regularly updated data blog called the School Tracker to inform parents of the relative COVID risk in various schools throughout the GTA. On January 1, 2022, in response to this emerging data gap, The Local launched the RAT Tracker, a portal where parents could report the results of their children's rapid antigen tests (RAT). Using this data, they would compile COVID cases on a school level in Toronto in order to equip parents, students, and education staff with the information they need to be safe when returning to school.

The Local is a member of Press Forward, a collection of independent Canadian publications dedicated to unifying, elevating, and advocating for independent media organizations and working towards strengthening innovation, inclusivity and diversity in media across Canada.

Awards 
On May 3, 2022, The Local's pandemic coverage of Ontario's Peel region was won the 2022 World Press Freedom Award. The award recognizes Fatima Syed's groundbreaking reporting in her three feature articles, “You Can’t Stop the Spread of the Virus if You Don’t Stop it in Peel,” “The Chaotic Race to Vaccinate Peel,” and “We Had to Save Ourselves.”The award was presented to both Fatima Syed and The Local's Editor-in-Chief, Tai Huynh.

References

External links 

 

2019 establishments in Ontario
Magazines published in Toronto